The Davis Amendment was a provision attached to the March 28, 1928 reauthorization of the Radio Act of 1927, which mandated an "equality of radio broadcasting service" within the United States. It specified an "equitable allocation" among five regional zones, in addition to assignments proportional to population among the states within each zone. Its implementation resulted in the development of a complicated quota system by the Federal Radio Commission, and although its provisions were carried over to the Federal Communications Commission by the Communications Act of 1934, it ultimately proved impractical, and was repealed on June 5, 1936.

Adoption

Radio regulation in the United States had to be suspended in the summer of 1926, when it was ruled that the Commerce Department, operating under the provisions of the Radio Act of 1912, did not have the authority to specify the operating frequencies and powers for broadcasting stations. A period of worsening interference followed, and to restore order the Radio Act of 1927 was approved on February 23, 1927. This act created a new five member body, the Federal Radio Commission (FRC), which was given one year to stabilize the broadcasting situation.

Section 9 of the FRC's enabling act made a general declaration about the need to equitably distribute radio station assignments, stating:

The FRC was unable to finalize its plans within its one-year deadline, so in March 1928 the U.S. Congress extended its authorization until March 16, 1929. Proposed as a part of the reauthorization was an amendment, authored by Ewin L. Davis, a Democratic member of the House of Representatives from Tennessee, which specified in more detail the standards to be followed to ensure an "equitable allocation" of stations:

Davis' proposal was somewhat controversial. Support and opposition crossed party lines, and it was more likely to be favored in rural areas and the less developed south and west, while urban areas and the northeast and midwest, where most of the existing major radio stations were located, were more likely to oppose the measure. Despite strong opposition from the National Association of Broadcasters and the largest radio firms, the Davis Amendment rider was included as part of the FRC reauthorization.

Implementation

On November 11, 1928, the FRC put into effect a major reallocation of U.S. radio stations, under the provisions of its General Order 40. This reallocation partially met the requirements of the Davis Amendment, most notably by assigning eight clear channel frequencies to each of the five radio zones. However, there was still a need to quantify and reassign stations in order to more fully meet the Davis Amendment standards.

On June 17, 1930 the FRC released General Order No. 92, "Broadcasting stations classified according to values (units) for allocation equality between the five radio zones", which specified how "quota units" would be determined for evaluating an individual station's impact on state and zone quota allocations. Stations were assigned unit values of up to 5 points each, which was primarily determined by their transmitting power and hours of operation.

By late 1933, the FRC had adopted a policy that the national quota target would be 400 units, with 80 units assigned to each zone. Quota units assigned to individual stations ranged from 0.01 to 5. At this time the Commission reported difficulty in achieving balance within both the zone and individual state assignments. It reported that Zones 1 and 2 were currently under quota, while the other three were over. Some individual states were highly above or below their allocations, with the extremes of Florida at 107% over quota, and Wyoming at 59% under quota.

The effort to achieve equalization among zones and between states led to a number of reassignments and legal battles. In 1934 KYW, operating on a clear channel frequency assigned to Zone 2, but located in the Zone 4 city of Chicago, Illinois, was compelled to move to Philadelphia, Pennsylvania to conform to the zone requirements. Using the Davis Amendment standard as a justification, WJKS in Gary, Indiana petitioned the FRC to eliminate two stations located in Chicago, WIBO and WPCC, that were timesharing on 560 kHz, so that it could begin operating full-time on their cleared frequency. A major argument in favor of WJKS was that the "State of Indiana is 2.08 units or 22 per cent under-quota in station assignments and the State of Illinois is 12.49 units or 55 per cent over-quota". In 1933 the Supreme Court sided with the FRC's approval of the WJKS request, and WIBO and WPCC were deleted and replaced by WJKS. (Shortly thereafter WJKS changed its call letters to WIND, and a few years later, after the Davis Amendment had been repealed, moved from Gary to Chicago.)

The Communications Act of 1934, which replaced the FRC with the Federal Communications Commission (FCC), incorporated the Davis Amendment requirements in its Section 307(b), with one additional proviso:

However, even with this change the FCC struggled with implementing the Davis Amendment equalization requirements, and worked for its repeal.

Repeal
Reflecting the opposition to the Davis Amendment by members of the FCC, Senator Burton K. Wheeler, head of the Committee on Interstate Commerce, reported that "on May 23, 1935, the Chairman of the Federal Communications Commission wrote the chairman of your committee as follows":

Conforming to the wishes of the FCC, the U.S. Congress repealed the Davis Amendment on June 5, 1936. Although this allowed a modest increase in the number of radio stations, it did not lead to wholesale changes in the structure of the AM broadcast band, as most of its organization remained unchanged from what had been created while following the Davis Amendment requirements.

References

Broadcast law
United States federal communications legislation
History of telecommunications in the United States
Federal Radio Commission